Iglesia de la Divina Pastora  is a church located in San Fernando in the Province of Cádiz, Andalusia, Spain. It was built in the 18th century.

See also
Roman Catholic Diocese of Cádiz y Ceuta

References

Churches in San Fernando, Cádiz
18th-century Roman Catholic church buildings in Spain